Eshkarlet (also Romanized as Eshkārlet and Āshkārlet; also known as Eshkālī and Eshkārlīt) is a village in Kuhestan Rural District, Kelardasht District, Chalus County, Mazandaran Province, Iran. At the 2006 census, its population was 30, in 10 families.

References 

Populated places in Chalus County